"The Way I Mate" is a country-dance song by the Swedish band Rednex, released from their second album, Farm Out.

In keeping with the title of the song, moaning can be heard faintly in the background, especially near the end.

Track listing
 "The Way I Mate" (Single Version) – 3:46
 "The Way I Mate" (Extended Version) – 6:57
 "The Way I Mate" (Rally Remix) – 5:12
 "The Way I Mate" (L.A. Dub) – 8:31
 "The Way I Mate" (Gaelic Mix) – 5:56
 "The Way I Mate" (Karaoke D.I.Y.) – 3:44

Charts

References

1998 songs
1999 singles
Rednex songs
Songs written by Pat Reiniz